Grapholita andabatana is a moth of the family Tortricidae. It was described by Niels Laue Wolff in 1957. It is found in Denmark, France, Switzerland, Austria, Italy, Slovakia, Poland and Russia.

The wingspan is 10–12 mm. Adults are on wing from June to July.

The larvae feed on Sorbus species. They feed on the fruit of their host plant.

References

 "Grapholita andabatana (Wolff, 1957)". ''Insecta.pro. Retrieved February 5, 2020.

Moths described in 1957
Grapholitini
Moths of Europe